HD 81040 b is a massive gas giant exoplanet that orbits the star HD 81040, discovered in 2005 by radial velocity. Its orbital period is just over 1000 days. It has a semimajor axis of about 1.95 AU, and its orbit is quite eccentric, at a little over 0.5.

Astrometry of HD 81040 using Gaia, published in several papers, has determined an orbital inclination of about 111°. Since the inclination is high, there is a small chance that the planet transits.

See also
 HD 33564 b

References

Leo (constellation)
Giant planets
Exoplanets discovered in 2005
Exoplanets detected by radial velocity
Exoplanets detected by astrometry